Tulita, which in Slavey means "where the rivers or waters meet," is a hamlet in the Sahtu Region of the Northwest Territories, Canada. It was formerly known as Fort Norman, until 1 January 1996. It is located at the junction of the Great Bear River and the Mackenzie River; the Bear originates at Great Bear Lake adjacent to Deline.

Tulita is in an area that is forested and well south of the tree line. Permafrost underlays the area, more or less continuous in distribution. Tulita is surrounded by mountains, the latter renowned for Dall sheep, and faces the Mackenzie Mountains to the west, which has mountain goats.

History 
Fort Norman originated as a Hudson's Bay Company trading post in the 19th century and has occupied a number of geographical locations prior to the settling of the modern community. A post by the name of Fort Norman occupied several locations, on the Mackenzie River, on the islands within it, on Bear River, and on the shore of Great Bear Lake near the present location of Deline. Who the name 'Norman' commemorates is unclear, but it may have been either Alexander Norman McLeod or Archibald Norman McLeod, both of whom were prominent in the northwest in the early 19th century.

Between 1863 and 1869, Fort Norman was located on Great Bear Lake, a short distance west of what later became Deline (Fort Franklin), and was an HBC post commanded by Nichol Taylor. Roman Catholic missionary Émile Petitot operated a small mission here during that period. In 1869, Nichol Taylor moved Fort Norman to its present position at the confluence of the Mackenzie and Bear Rivers.

It has also become a permanent settlement for predominately Sahtu Dene people on whose traditional land the original trading post was built. In 1996, the name of Fort Norman was officially changed to Tulita, which translates in Dene to "where the rivers or waters meet."

Demographics 

In 2016, the majority of the population was Indigenous being First Nations and Métis. The main languages are North Slavey and English with some Dene.

Transport and tourism 
Tulita may be reached via air year-round, and is served by Tulita Airport; Norman Wells is the regional centre and the site of origin of the majority of flights in. A winter road links Tulita to Wrigley and thence the Mackenzie Highway, and is only open in mid- to late winter. Summer access is available by barge or by canoe, from Hay River along the Mackenzie River. The NWT government is seeking federal funding to extend the Mackenzie Highway from Wrigley through Tulita to Tsiigehtchic.

Amenities consist of a hotel, Northern Store, Royal Canadian Mounted Police detachment, and a nursing station. Chief Albert Wright School teaches grades K-12 while the hamlet has a library, arena, recreation hall, and fitness centre.

First Nations

The Dene First Nations people of Tulita are represented by the Tulita Dene First Nation, a band government operating within the community. The TDFN is a member of the Sahtu Dene Council, joining the Behdzi Ahda' First Nation, Délı̨nę First Nation, and Fort Good Hope First Nation.

Treaty Indians from the community are party to the Sahtu Agreement, which gives them shared title to 41,437 square kilometers of land in the Sahtu Region. Under the Sahtu Agreement, self-government negotiations are ongoing in all five of the region's communities, but as of 2019 only Délı̨nę has successfully reached a Final Agreement.

Notable people
Leslie Nielsen lived here while his father was stationed with the Royal Canadian Mounted Police.

Gallery

Climate
Tulita experiences a subarctic climate (Koppen: Dfc) with generally mild to warm summers and cold winters with highs often well-below zero. Peak snowfall occurs in the months of October and November, while rainfall is limited to the warmer months.

See also
 List of municipalities in the Northwest Territories

References

Communities in the Sahtu Region
Dene communities
Hudson's Bay Company trading posts
Hamlets in the Northwest Territories
Populated places on the Mackenzie River
Road-inaccessible communities of the Northwest Territories